Vivaro is a comune in the province of Pordenone, northern Italy.

Vivaro may also refer to:
 Opel Vivaro (disambiguation) and Vauxhall Vivaro, a series of light commercial vehicles
 VBET, an Armenian gambling company formerly known as Vivaro Bet

See also
 Vivaro Romano, a commune near Rome, in Italy
 Vivaro-Alpine dialect, spoken in southeastern France and northwestern Italy